San Miguel del Milagro is a town in the municipality of Nativitas in the state of Tlaxcala in Mexico. It was the site of a 1631 apparition of St. Michael the Archangel to Diego Lázaro.

References 

Populated places in Tlaxcala